Era Square (also known as Terminal 2) is a mixed development project located in Seremban, Negeri Sembilan in Malaysia. It was developed and is maintained by Era Baru Sdn Bhd.

Era Square is located within  proximity to the PLUS NSE (exiting the Seremban Interchange) and is accessible via domestic bus services (500m from Terminal One).

Terminal 2
In October 2008, a cinema opened for viewers, especially Seremban folks. The 6-screen Cineplex is owned by MBO Cinemax and later renovated into 10 halls. The RM 50 mil Terminal 2 express bus station at Era Walk which was supposed to have started operations more than two years ago received a lifeline when Konsortium Transnasional Berhad (KTB) agreed to house its operations there.

KTB, the country's largest private bus operator with a fleet of 1,500 vehicles, runs the Transnasional, Nice, Plusliner and Cityliner companies. At present, the company operates some 200 buses in Negri Sembilan.

Gallery

References

External links
Official website

Buildings and structures in Seremban
Shopping malls in Negeri Sembilan